Mary Anna Randolph Custis Lee (October 1, 1807 – November 5, 1873) was the wife of the Confederate general Robert E.  Lee and the last private owner of Arlington Estate. She was the daughter of George Washington Parke Custis who was the grandson of Martha Dandridge Custis Washington, the wife of George Washington.

Custis married Lee – who was at the time a U.S. Army officer – in 1831 at her parents' home, Arlington House in Virginia . Although she sometimes lived with Lee when he was assigned elsewhere, she preferred to live at Arlington House with her parents. (Lee's ancestral home, Stratford Hall, where he was born, was inherited by his half-brother, Henry; Lee himself never owned a permanent residence.)

Lee was offered command of the combined forces of the U.S. Army as the American Civil War began, but instead decided to serve his home state of Virginia; he eventually commanded the Confederate Army of Northern Virginia.  He survived the war, became the president of Washington College, and died in 1870, three years before she did in 1873.

They had seven children, three boys and four girls.

Life

Mary Anna Randolph Lee was descended from southern colonial families, including those of Parke Custis, Fitzhugh, Dandrige, Randolph, Rolfe, and Gerard. Through her paternal grandmother, Eleanor Calvert, she descended from Charles Calvert, 5th Baron Baltimore, making her a descendant of Charles II of England and Scotland. Through her mother, Mary Lee Fitzhugh Custis, she was a descendant of William Fitzhugh.

Mary Anna Custis Lee was the only surviving child of George Washington Parke Custis and Mary Lee Fitzhugh Custis, daughter of William Fitzhugh and Ann Bolling Randolph Fitzhugh. Her godmother, Mary Randolph, was the first person buried at Arlington Estate. She wrote a book on housekeeping and cooking. Mrs. Lee's birth year is usually shown as 1808, but it recorded as 1807 in the Custis family Bible, her mother's papers, and is referred to in a letter her mother wrote in the autumn of 1807. She was born at Annefield in Clarke County, Virginia when her mother's coach stopped there during a journey.  She was well educated, having learned both Latin and Greek.

She enjoyed discussing politics with her father, and later with her husband. She kept current with the new literature. After her father's death, she edited and published his writings as Recollections and Private Memoirs of Washington, by his Adopted Son George Washington Parke Custis, with a Memoir of this Author by his Daughter in 1859.

Mary Custis was diminutive and vivacious. She had known her third cousin, Robert E. Lee from their childhood.  Her mother and Robert Lee's mother were second cousins.  Lee's father, "Light-Horse Harry" Lee, a hero of the American Revolutionary War, delivered the eulogy at George Washington's funeral. Among Mary Anna's other suitors was Sam Houston.

Mary Anna Randolph Custis Lee inherited Arlington House from her father when he died in 1857. The estate had been the couple's home during her husband's military career. She was a gracious hostess and enjoyed frequent visitors. She was a painter, like her father, and painted many landscapes, some of which are still on view at the house. She loved roses and grew many varieties of trees and flowers in the gardens there.

Deeply religious, Lee attended Episcopal services when there was one near the army post. From Arlington, Virginia, the Lees attended Christ Church in Alexandria, which she and Robert had both attended in childhood.

Lee taught her female slaves to read and write and was an advocate of eventual emancipation. She did not free her slaves in her lifetime.  She suffered from rheumatoid arthritis, which became increasingly debilitating with advancing age. By 1861, she was using a wheelchair.

With the advent of the U.S. Civil War, Mary Custis Lee delayed evacuating Arlington House until May 15, 1861. Early that month, Robert wrote to his wife saying:

War is inevitable, and there is no telling when it will burst around you ... You have to move and make arrangements to go to some point of safety which you must select. The Mount Vernon plate and pictures ought to be secured. Keep quiet while you remain, and in your preparations ... May God keep and preserve you and have mercy on all our people.

Lee and her daughters initially moved among the several family plantations. In May 1862, she was caught at her son Rooney's White House plantation in New Kent County behind the Federal lines, as Union forces moved up the York and the Pamunkey rivers toward Richmond. The Union commander, George B. McClellan, allowed her passage through the lines in order to take up residence in Richmond—the city which was also McClellan's campaign goal.

Lee and her daughters settled at 707 East Franklin Street in Richmond for a time. The family next moved to the plantation estate of the Cocke family at Bremo Bluff, where they sought refuge until after the end of the war in November 1865.

After the war, the Lees lived in Powhatan County for a short time before moving to Lexington. Robert E. Lee became president of the Washington College, later renamed Washington and Lee University. Mary Anna Custis Lee visited her beloved Arlington House one last time in 1873, a few months before her death.  She was unable to leave her horse carriage due to her debilitating rheumatoid arthritis, hardly recognizing the estate except for a few old oaks and some of the trees that she and Robert had planted.

Mary Anna Custis Lee died at the age of 66, surviving her famous husband by three years. She is buried next to him in the Lee family crypt at University Chapel on the campus of Washington and Lee University.

Marriage and family
Mary and Robert were married at her parents' home, Arlington House, on June 30, 1831. They had three sons and four daughters together: George Washington Custis "Custis", William H. Fitzhugh "Rooney", Robert Edward Jr., Mary, Eleanor Agnes (called Agnes), Anne, and Mildred Lee. None of their daughters married.

Ancestry

Cultural references
Harnett Kane's 1953 novel, The Lady of Arlington, is based on Mrs. Lee's life.

Mary Custis Lee is a major supporting character in The Guns of the South, a 1992 science fiction novel by Harry Turtledove.

Dorothy Love's 2016 novel, Mrs. Lee and Mrs. Gray, is based on Lee's dependence upon and friendship with Selina Norris Gray, a Custis family slave who became Lee's housekeeper and confidante.

Mary Anna Custis Lee plays a minor role in Jeff Shaara’s 1996 novel Gods and Generals.

References

External links
 Lee Family Digital Archive
 Collection of Mary Custis Lee digitized letters
Correspondences of Mary Anna Custis Lee during the American Civil War - held in the Walter Havighurst Special Collections, Miami University

1807 births
1873 deaths
19th-century American Episcopalians
19th-century American women
American slave owners
American people of English descent
American socialites
People from Arlington County, Virginia
Bolling family of Virginia
Burials at University Chapel
Custis family of Virginia
Fitzhugh family of Virginia
Mary Anna
Randolph family of Virginia
Washington family
People from Lexington, Virginia
Women in the American Civil War
American women slave owners